Avyakta, meaning "not manifest", "unmanifest" etc., is the word ordinarily used to denote Prakrti on account of subtleness of its nature and is also used to denote Brahman, which is the subtlest of all and who by virtue of that subtlety is the ultimate support (asraya) of Prakrti. Avyakta as a category along with Mahat (Cosmic Intelligence) and Purusa plays an important role in the later Samkhya philosophy even though the Bhagavad Gita III.42 retaining the psychological categories altogether drops out the Mahat and the Avyakta (Unmanifest), the two objective categories.

Avyakta and origin of things

Charaka gives six elements or dhatus by adding Chetana to the five elements "earth", "water", "fire", "air" and "space". Chetana is identified with Purusa and the Avyakta-part of Prakrti treated as one category and called Paramatman. It is when Purusa or Chetana is connected with the body of senses and mind that consciousness can come to the self; consciousness is a phenomenon of the soul-mind-body complex. According to Bhagavad Gita XIII.1-2, Vikara or the evolutionary products of Prakrti are the Ksetras (Field) (Living organisms) and the Avyakta-part of Purusa or Chetana or Paramatman is the Ksetragna (Knower of the Field) (the individual self) (the Supreme Self).

According to Sushruta’s views on the evolutionary process set in motion by Consciousness, Mahan (Intellect) is generated from Avyakta or mula-prakrti, from that Mahan, Ahamkara (Ego) is produced having the same qualities, and from Ahamkara are produced the twenty four elements that are achetana (unconscious) in nature, and the twenty-fifth element is the Jiva (Purusa or soul).

Paingala Upanishad, extending the instructions of the Mandukya Upanishad states that the mula-prakrti (body) becomes animated by associating with the witnessing consciousness which is the conditioned Brahman, and begins to evolve. Its first evolute is Avyakta which has Ishvara-consciousness as its subject animating soul. Pure consciousness of Brahman descends into or becomes Ishvara - self with Avyakta as the body. Thus, at that stage of evolution the Avyakta is the "causal body".

Avyakta and Maya

Maya, a Vedantic metamorphosis of the Samkhya Prakrti, is called Avyakta, not manifest, devoid of form etc., because one cannot obtain awareness of it by sense-perception and it cannot be seen in its native or true nature. It is to be inferred from its effects by persons whose intellect functions in accord with the declarations of Sruti. In its special condition it is spoken of as Susupti ("dreamless sleep") when in it the buddhi (Intellect) and the indriyas (senses) are completely dissolved and cease to function, when all pramanas (sources of knowledge) are still, and buddhi remains only in the form of a seed, the test of this is the universal verdict – "I did not know anything (while asleep)". Maya is the power of Ishvara or the conditioned Brahman as Saguna Brahman to create, which power is unimaginable and wonderful. It is the power to create drawn from the unconditioned Brahman or Nirguna Brahman, for effect without cause is impossible. Avyakta or Maya is beginningless avidya, it has no reality in the absolute sense and is destroyed by knowledge. It is compacted in three gunas - sattva, rajas and tamas, which by themselves are its constituents. Maya is of the nature of these three gunas and is superior to its effects. By virtue of being the cause of all transformations beginning with akasa and by virtue of the sruti which intimates the evolutions brought about by iksana ("seeing", "thinking"), samkalpa ("purposing") and parinama ("transformation"), Maya is established Shvetashvatara Upanishad - Know that Maya is Prakrti and Maheswara to be the Mayain, the wielder of Maya). It gives birth to this world. Maya is responsible for the reflected being of Ishvara and Avidya for the reflection that is the Jiva. From Maya is born everything from the Mahat to Brahmanda that is known as the Karanasarira or the "Causal body of the atman". The Karana sarira is called avyakta because not being available for sense-perception it is to be inferred from its effects.- Vivekachudamani.110, 122, 123

The Doctrine of Maya is not a fabrication of Adi Shankara. In the Rig Veda and the Upanishads Maya is generally meant "power"; it is in the Shvetashvatara Upanishad that Maya is identified with Prakrti and brought in to mean "illusion", and in the Bhagavad Gita, as "magical power". Adi Shankara does not accept the Samkhya view that Avyakta signifies Pradhana in its unmanifested state because the sage of the Katha Upanishad I.iii.10-11 does not define Avykta as Pradhana, nor indicates what should be known by this word. Primarily, Avyakta denotes "the antecedent seed stage of this world" in which it is not manifested by names and forms. Shankara replaces Pradhana as definition of seed is of the nature of Avidya and is signified by the word Avyakta, and having the supreme Lord (Brahman) as its ground is of the nature of Maya and is the great sleep in which transmigratory souls unaware of their form continue to slumber on.

Significance

When they first evolve from Avyakta the five subtle elements, then unable to participate in any action, do not have a form, later on out of these five only earth, water and fire acquire corporeality. The composition of Akasa containing the greatest amount of sattva was duly considered by the Upanishadic thinkers but the composition of "Time" which is dependent on "space" was left unconsidered. Lokacharya of the Vishishtadvaita school regarded Time as the cause of transformation of Prakrti and its mutation, but Srinivasa regarded the invisible incorporeal Time, which is an object of perception through the six sense-organs, as matter devoid of the three gunas,  and that Time that is eternal in the transcendental abode of God is non-eternal in the world. The Advaita School regards the world and therefore all substances as appearance due to an undefinable principle called the "Cosmic Nescience" or Maya, which is neither real nor unreal but undefinable. The Advaitins connect Time with the empirical world alone. As creation means the appearance of names and forms, they cannot exist before creation; also the difference between objects of the same class can have no reference to Sat, the "non-existent" simply does not exist.

The Bhagavad Gita declares that – "Far beyond even this Avyakta (the Unmanfest referred to in the earlier Verse 18) there is yet another unmanifest Existence, that  Supreme being who does not perish. The same Unmanifest which has been spoken of as the Indestructible is also called the supreme goal; that again is My supreme Abode, attaining which they return not to this mortal world.  Thus, the Sruti and the Smrti both declare the existence of Avyakta which as Maya is the upadhi of Ishvara; the five sheaths (Panchakosa-sarira) which are the effects of Maya are the upadhis of Jiva, when these upadhis are effectively removed there is no Ishvara and no jiva''- Vivekachudamani.245-6.

References

Vedanta